Charrah (also Romanized as Chārrāh) is a village in Sharifabad Rural District, in the Central District of Sirjan County, Kerman Province, Iran. At the 2006 census, its population was 39, in 6 families.

References 

Populated places in Sirjan County